Marcel Dussault (14 May 1926 – 19 September 2014) was a French professional road racing cyclist. He won 21 races in a professional career that ran from 1948 to 1959. He won Paris–Bourges in 1948 and 1949 and a stage in the 1949 Tour de France, wearing the yellow jersey as leader of the general classification the following day. He won another two Tour stages in 1950 and 1954.

Major results

1948
Paris–Bourges
1949
Paris–Bourges
Circuit des Deux Ponts
Tour de France:
Winner stage 1
Wearing yellow jersey for one day
1950
Tour de France:
Winner stage 10
1953
3rd stage Tour du Sud-Est
1954
Tour de France:
Winner stage 3

References

External links
Palmarès of Marcel Dussault

1926 births
2014 deaths
Sportspeople from Indre
French male cyclists
French Tour de France stage winners
Cyclists from Centre-Val de Loire